The Trois-Rivières Draveurs ("Raftmen") were a Canadian junior ice hockey team playing in the Quebec Major Junior Hockey League (QMJHL). They played home games at the Colisée de Trois-Rivières, in Trois-Rivières, Quebec. The team was originally known as the Trois-Rivières Ducs ("Dukes") and were a founding member of the QMJHL in 1969. They were renamed the Draveurs in 1973.

History
The Draveurs finished first place in the QMJHL in 1977–78 with 101 points, and again in 1978–79 with 122 points. Those two seasons, Trois-Rivières won consecutive President's Cups. The Draveurs were also league finalists in 1980–81, 1981–82, and 1991–92, during the final season in Trois-Rivières.

During the 1991–92 season, Manon Rhéaume was a goaltender for the Draveurs and became the first female to play in the Canadian Hockey League.

The team moved to Sherbrooke, in 1992, where they were renamed the Sherbrooke Faucons, and later, the Sherbrooke Castors. They moved again in 2003 to become the Lewiston Maineiacs only to fold in 2011.

Notable coaches
Jean Bégin
Michel Bergeron
Alain Vigneault

Notable players
Luc Tardif (later president of the International Ice Hockey Federation)

NHL alumni
List of Trois-Rivières players who also played in the National Hockey League (NHL).

Pierre Aubry
Joel Baillargeon
Ray Bourque
Francois Breault
Paul Brousseau
Eric Charron
Enrico Ciccone
Jacques Cloutier
Roland Cloutier
Alain Daigle
Richard David
Martin Desjardins
André Doré
Donald Dufresne
Benoit Gosselin
Gilles Hamel
Denis Herron
Jean-François Labbé
Pierre Lacroix
Claude Lapointe
Steve Larouche
Alain Lemieux
Claude Lemieux
Eric Messier
Bob Mongrain
Yanic Perreault
Michel Picard
Alain Raymond
Pascal Rheaume
Normand Rochefort
Dominic Roussel
Yves Sarault
Jean-François Sauvé
Martin St. Amour
Christian Tanguay
Jocelyn Thibault
Brent Tremblay
Pascal Trepanier
Claude Verret
Alain Vigneault

References

1969 establishments in Quebec
1992 disestablishments in Quebec
Defunct Quebec Major Junior Hockey League teams
Ice hockey clubs established in 1969
Sport in Trois-Rivières
Sports clubs disestablished in 1992